The Nevada Department of Motor Vehicles (DMV) is a Nevada state agency responsible for issuing driver licenses and vehicle registration. The DMV operates a total of 20 offices across the state, with five in Las Vegas, two in Reno, and one each in Henderson, Sparks, Carson City, Elko, Ely, Fallon, Hawthorne, Laughlin, Mesquite, Pahrump, Tonopah, Winnemucca, and Yerington. The DMV is headed by a director, and the position is currently occupied by Julie Butler. It is based in Carson City, Nevada's capital.

History 
The DMV was created by the Nevada Legislature on July 1, 1957. From 1985 to 2001, the department was known as the Nevada Department of Motor Vehicles and Public Safety because various public safety agencies were merged into the department in 1985, 1993, and 1995. In August 2001, the public safety agencies were split off into a new Nevada Department of Public Safety, while the Department of Motor Vehicles became an independent state agency again as it was in 1957.

Structure 
The Nevada DMV has seven divisions, which are the following:

 Field Services Division
 Research and Project Management Division
 Administrative Services Division
 Motor Carrier Division
 Central Services and Records Division
 Compliance Enforcement Division
 Motor Vehicle Information Technology Division

See also

Department of Motor Vehicles
Driver's license in the United States
Driving in the United States
Government of Nevada
Vehicle registration plates of the United States

References

External links
Nevada Department of Motor Vehicles

Transportation in Nevada
State agencies of Nevada
Motor vehicle registration agencies